The Indian Navy currently operates three commands — Western Naval Command located at Mumbai, Southern Naval Command located at Kochi and Eastern Naval Command located at Visakhapatnam. The Andaman and Nicobar Command, a unified Indian Navy, Army, Air Force and Coast Guard Command was set up in the Andaman and Nicobar Islands in 2001.

List of naval establishments 

Note:

** = Under construction

See also

 Indian navy related lists
 Aircraft of the Indian Navy
 List of active Indian Navy ships
 List of Indian naval aircraft
 List of submarines of the Indian Navy
 List of ships of the Indian Navy

 Indian military related
 India-China Border Roads
 Indian military satellites
 List of Indian Air Force stations
 India's overseas military bases
 Indian Nuclear Command Authority

Notes

References 

 
Navy bases
Naval lists